Ellis Ferreira and Rick Leach were the defending champions but they competed with different partners that year, Ferreira with Pavel Vízner and Leach with Brian MacPhie.

Ferreira and Vízner lost in the first round to Yves Allegro and Marco Chiudinelli.

Leach and MacPhie lost in the semifinals to Bob Bryan and Mike Bryan.

The Bryans won in the final 7–6(7–1), 7–5 against Mark Knowles and Daniel Nestor.

Seeds
Champion seeds are indicated in bold text while text in italics indicates the round in which those seeds were eliminated.

  Mark Knowles /  Daniel Nestor (final)
  Bob Bryan /  Mike Bryan (champions)
  Martin Damm /  Cyril Suk (first round)
  Lucas Arnold /  Gastón Etlis (quarterfinals)

Draw

External links
 2002 Davidoff Swiss Indoors Doubles Draw

2002 ATP Tour
2002 Davidoff Swiss Indoors